Ryan Conbeer (born 5 February 1999) is a Welsh rugby union player who plays for Scarlets and Llanelli RFC as a winger.

Professional career 
Conbeer first played for Tenby RFC, before moving to Narberth RFC at U12 level. While with Narberth, Conbeer was selected for Wales U16. Conbeer played for Scarlets U16, and joined the academy. He progressed into the Wales U18 side, and joined them on a tour to South Africa.

Conbeer earned his first call-up to the Wales U20s squad for the 2017 Six Nations Under 20s Championship. Conbeer's debut came in a victory to Italy U20, a game in which Conbeer scored a try. Over three seasons, he made 23 appearances in total for the U20 side, scoring five tries.

At age 17, Conbeer made his debut for the Scarlets in 2016 in a 44–21 victory against Bath. In 2017, he graduated from the Scarlets academy and signed a development contract with the club, and began to train full time with the first team that summer. Conbeer made his competitive debut on 24 February 2018 against Ulster, scoring a try in the bonus point win.

In 2018, Conbeer was selected for Wales Sevens for the Dubai leg. An injury during the tournament limited his involvement.

Conbeer scored two tries in the 2019 Boxing Day derby win over the Ospreys. On 14 November 2020, Conbeer scored twice as the Scarlets earned an away win in Connacht. In 2022, Conbeer signed a contract extension with the Scarlets. On 30 April 2022 Conbeer scored a hattrick against the Ospreys.

References

External links 

 Scarlets profile

1999 births
Scarlets players
Llanelli RFC players
Living people
Welsh rugby union players
Rugby union wings
Rugby union players from Pembrokeshire